Delfina Tuncap Guerrero (1915 – 2004) was First Lady of Guam  from 1963 to 1969.

Early life 
On March 9, 1915, Guerrero was born as  Delfina Tuncap, a Chamorro, in Agana, Guam. Guerrero's mother was Dolores Namauleg Tuncap.

Career 
In 1961, when Manuel Flores Leon Guerrero was appointed by President John F. Kennedy as the Governor of Guam, Guerrero became the First Lady of Guam on January 20, 1963, until July 20, 1969.

Personal life 
In 1934, Guerrero married Manuel Flores Leon Guerrero (1914-1985), who later became a Guamanian politician and Governor of Guam. They had seven children, Alfred Delfin (b.1935), Lolita Mariguita (1936-1982), Rudolpho Beltram (1938-1988), Evelyna Rebecca (b.1940), Teresita Recqual (b.1946), Manuel Flores (b.1947), and Patricia Christine (1953-1984). Guerrero and her family lived in Agana, Guam.

Guerrero's daughter Lolita Leon Guerrero Huxel (1936-1982) became a Chamorro linguist and professor at University of Guam. She died in Hawaii.

Guerrero's daughter Dr. Teresita L.G. Cottrell became a neuropsychologist.

By 1988, several of Guerrero's children have died, including Lolita Leon Guerrero Huxel, Patricia Christine Borland, and "Rudy" Rudolpho Beltram Leon Guerrero.

On January 5, 2004, Guerrero died in Guam. She was 88 years old. Guerrero is interred at Pigo Catholic Cemetery in Hagåtña, Guam.

References

External links 
 Delfina T Lon Guerrero in the 1940 Census at ancestry.com
 Delfina Leon Guerrero at findagrave.com
 Delfina Tuncap at uog.edu

1915 births
2004 deaths
Chamorro people
First Ladies and Gentlemen of Guam
Guamanian Democrats
Guamanian women in politics